Bernard Lens I (c.1630–1707) was a Dutch painter and writer of religious treatises.

Lens was born in the Netherlands, and later moved to England. He primarily painted miniatures, practicing enamel techniques. His son Bernard Lens II and grandson Bernard Lens III also grew up to become artists in their own right.

References

Portrait miniaturists
Dutch painters
Dutch male painters
English male painters
17th-century English painters
18th-century English painters
1630 births
1707 deaths
Dutch emigrants to the Kingdom of England
Place of birth missing
18th-century English male artists